Home for the Holidays is the first Christmas album by American recording artist Anthony Hamilton. It was released on October 21, 2014, by RCA Records.

Critical reception

Allmusic editor Andy Kellman found that "Hamilton delivers a mostly upbeat mix of original material and renditions of traditional secular and religious Christmas-themed songs [..] The singer adds his typically hospitable tones to each of the selections, whether it's a faithful version of James Brown's "Santa Claus Go Straight to the Ghetto" or an energized spin on "Little Drummer Boy." This is more imaginative and festive than the average Christmas album."

Track listing

Credits and personnel
Credits are taken from the album's liner notes.

Managerial
 A&R – Adonis Sutherlin 
 Executive producers – Anthony Hamilton, Kelvin Wooten, Eli Davis
 Management – Eli Davis
 Project coordinator – Kimrie Davis 

Visuals and imagery
 Photography and design – LaVan Anderson
 Styling – Charity Luvs

Charts

Weekly charts

Year-end charts

References

External links

2014 Christmas albums
Anthony Hamilton (musician) albums
Christmas albums by American artists
Contemporary R&B Christmas albums
RCA Records Christmas albums